3 milagros is a Colombian drama telenovela premiered on Colombian broadcast channel RCN Televisión on September 20, 2011, and concluded on January 19, 2012, based on the book written by the Venezuelan author Miguel Otero Silva, entitled Cuando quiero llorar no lloro. The show is produced by Teleset and RCN Televisión and it stars Angélica Blandón, Johanna Bahamón, Farina Paucar Franco as the Milagro's sisters, along with Andrés Sandoval, Sandra Reyes, and Julio Sánchez Cóccaro.

Cast 
 Angélica Blandón as Milagros "Milala" Rendón
 María José Vargas Agudelo as "Milala" Rendón (child)
 Johanna Bahamón as Milagros "Milu" Fontanarrosa
  as "Milú" Fontanarrosa (child)
 Farina Paucar Franco as Milagros "Nikita" Cruz
 María José Rangel as "Nikita" Cruz (child)
 Andrés Sandoval as Fernando "Nando" Rendón
  as "Nando" Rendón (young)
 Carlos Ochoa as "Nando" Rendón (child)
  as Marcelo Botero
 Jaime Andrés Pérez Osorio as Marcelo Botero (child)
 Julio Sánchez Cóccaro as Tomas Rendón
 Sandra Reyes as Aleyda de Rendón
 Luz Stella Luengas as Dioselina de Rendón
 Xiomara Xibille as María Patricia Botero de Fontanarrosa
 Juan Carlos Messier as Ricardo Fontanarrosa
 Bianca Arango as Ivonne Botero
 María Angélica Mallarino as Inés de Botero
 Carlos Duplat as Álvaro Botero
 Indhira Serrano as Visitación "Madonna" de Cruz
 Alberto Cardeño as Guadalupe Cruz
  as Mama Sunta
 Mauricio Bastidas as Pedro Venildo Cáceres "PVC"
 Juan Manuel Julio as "PVC" (child)
 Ana Bolena Meza as Reina Cecilia Delgadillo
 Cristian Gómez as Charly
 José Manuel Henao as John Fredy Riasco, Alias "El Astro"
 Mari Pili Barreda as Melisa
 Juliana Betancourth as Leidy
 Luis Eduardo Motoa as Rafael Peláez
 Alejandro Gutiérrez as Juez Urrea
 Vida Torres as Cinthya
 Carlos Arbeláez as Guillermo
 Carolina Ramírez as Tatiana Cifuentes
 Julio César Meza as Maicol
 Cristian Mosquera as Maicol Jr
 Biassini  Segura as Salvador Rendón
 Luis Giraldo as Salvador Rendón (child)
 Carlos Fernándes as Teniente Aquiles Suárez
 Andres Felipe Torres as Byron
 Isa Mosquera as "La Negra"
 Diego Ramos as Valentino
 Jefferson Medina as "Rasquiña"
 Patricia Castañeda as Celina
 Miguel Ramos as Pancho Villa
 Javier Sáenz as Américo
 Ilja Rosendahl as Marco Bellini
 Antún Castro as "el Iluminado"
 Walter Díaz as Augusto Landazo
 Carolina Sepúlveda as Teniente Sachica
 Milena Granados as Jaqueline
 Fernando Arango as "el Cordobés"
 Brian Moreno as Elkin
 Daniel Serna as Sibachoque
 Liliana Vanegas as Cadete Alférez
 John Alex Castillo as Ramiro
 Carlos Serrato as Teniente Rojas
 Emilia Ceballos as Laura Sáenz
 Andrés Parra as Roberto Alias "el Socio"
 Ítalo Londero as Samy Cohen
 Christian de Dios as Tsunami
 Jennifer Arenas as Cadete Patricia

References

External links 
 

2011 telenovelas
2011 Colombian television series debuts
2012 Colombian television series endings
Colombian telenovelas
RCN Televisión telenovelas
Spanish-language telenovelas
Television shows set in Colombia
Television series by Teleset